Arthur George Strobel (November 28, 1922 in Regina, Saskatchewan – October 11, 1991) was a professional ice hockey player who played seven games in the National Hockey League.  He played with the New York Rangers. Strobel's son, Eric Strobel, won a gold medal playing for the 1980 US Olympic Hockey Team.

Strobel coached the Rochester Mustangs until 1958, when Ken Johannson succeeded him.

References

External links

1922 births
1991 deaths
Canadian ice hockey left wingers
Sportspeople from Regina, Saskatchewan
New York Rangers players
New York Rovers players
Ice hockey people from Saskatchewan
Canadian expatriate ice hockey players in the United States